Indonesian Livestock Research Center is a research center whose tasks involve the research of poultry, cattle, buffaloes, goats, sheep, etc. It is located in Banjarwaru Street, Ciawi, Bogor Regency, West Java.

Research
Research papers published by this center include:
Characterization of microsatelite sequences in ducks.
Analysis of the nutrition value of Aspergillus niger fermentation in palm kernels.
Synergistic enzyme activity from Eupenicillium javanicum dan Aspergillus niger NRRL 337 fermentation in palm kernel oil.

References

External links
  
Youtube https://www.youtube.com/channel/UCKdkBFvj1u1q8UfxKQqwIsw

bogor Regency
Research institutes in Indonesia